Fighting Woman News was an American feminist periodical founded in 1975. Published quarterly by Spectrum Resources, the magazine wrote and advocated about martial arts, self-defense, and combative sports for and by women. It published news and articles on techniques, workshops, and events. Fighting Woman News also regularly sent representatives to women's conferences to promote self-defense and martial arts literature for women.

Print copies of the magazine sold for $6 for yearly individual subscriptions and $10 for institutions.

References 

Feminism and education
Feminist organizations in the United States
Self-defense
Martial art techniques
Feminist magazines